The Arsenal Stadium Mystery is a novel by Leonard Gribble. It was first published by George G. Harrap and Co. in 1939.

It was later turned into a film of the same name, directed by Thorold Dickinson.

References

1939 British novels
British mystery novels
British novels adapted into films
Novels about association football
George G. Harrap and Co. books
Arsenal F.C. mass media